Juanita may refer to:

Names/places
Diminutive of Juana, a female given name in Spanish
Mummy Juanita, or "The Ice Maiden", 15th-century Inca mummy discovered in 1995
Juanita, Kirkland, Washington, a neighborhood of the city of Kirkland
Juanita High School, in King County, Washington, USA
Juanita's, music venue in Little Rock, Arkansas, USA
Hacienda Juanita, hotel in Puerto Rico
Juanita, an earlier spelling of Waneta in British Columbia, Canada

Songs
"Juanita" (song), also known as "Nita Juanita" 
Wanita or Juanita, 1923 Al Jolson hit song
"Juanita", 1956 hit song by Chuck Willis
"Juanita" (Underworld song), a 1996 album track by Underworld
"Juanita", track from The Gilded Palace of Sin by the Flying Burrito Brothers
"Juanita", song by Björn Afzelius on the Hoola Bandoola Band album Fri Information
"Juanita Banana" (song), a song by Tash Howard and Murray Kenton

Film/TV
Juanita (1935 film), film directed by Pierre Caron
Juanita (2019 film), film starring Alfre Woodard
Juanita Banana, a Philippine TV series
Juanita Tennasynn, a character on Harvey Girls Forever!

Other
Juanita, a 1947 book by Leo Politi
Janey
Joanie